Peter Edwin Bocage (31 July 1887 – 3 December 1967) was an American jazz trumpeter and violinist.

Career
At 21, he played violin as the leader of a ragtime band, the Superior Orchestra, which included Bunk Johnson. He played trumpet in the Tuxedo Orchestra, the Onward Brass Band, and as the leader of the Excelsior Brass Band. He played with King Oliver's band, the Fate Marable Orchestra, and A. J. Piron. He performed with Sidney Bechet and at the Cotton Club in New York City. He made records with Piron's New Orleans Orchestra in 1923, and later with his band the Creole Serenaders. In later years he performed at Preservation Hall in New Orleans.

References

1887 births
1967 deaths
Jazz musicians from New Orleans
American jazz cornetists
American jazz violinists
American male violinists
20th-century American violinists
20th-century American male musicians
American male jazz musicians
Tuxedo Brass Band members
Excelsior Brass Band members
Onward Brass Band members
Eureka Brass Band members
The Eagle Band members